Carlos André Filipe Martins (born 15 April 1982 in Setúbal), known as Carlos André, is a Portuguese footballer who plays as a left winger.

References

1982 births
Living people
Sportspeople from Setúbal
Portuguese footballers
Association football wingers
Liga Portugal 2 players
Segunda Divisão players
Vitória F.C. players
Casa Pia A.C. players
F.C. Oliveira do Hospital players
S.C. Espinho players
C.D. Pinhalnovense players
Atlético Clube de Portugal players
União Montemor players
C.D. Cova da Piedade players
Cypriot First Division players
Doxa Katokopias FC players
Olympiakos Nicosia players
Football League (Greece) players
Portuguese expatriate footballers
Expatriate footballers in Cyprus
Expatriate footballers in Greece
Portuguese expatriate sportspeople in Cyprus
Portuguese expatriate sportspeople in Greece